Andre Thomas may refer to:

Andre Thomas, convicted murderer and death row inmate in Texas
André J. Thomas (born 1952), American composer, conductor, and professor of music at Florida State University